Impure Thoughts is a 1986 American comedy film. The film was directed by Michael A. Simpson. It marked Alyson Hannigan's feature film debut.

Plot
Four male friends are reunited after not being in contact with each other for several years. However, the meeting place is Purgatory, the afterlife state of limbo between heaven and hell. In Purgatory, these friends reflect on their pasts while they were living. They especially focus on their years in Catholic school and their coming of age.

Cast
 John Putch as Danny Stubbs
 Terry Beaver as William Miller
 Brad Dourif as Kevin Harrington
 Lane Davies as Steve Barrett
 Judith Anderson - narration
 Alyson Hannigan as Patty Stubs (credited as Allison Hannigan)

Production
The budget was less than $500,000.

Release
The film's distributor was based in Springfield, Massachusetts and released the film in the Boston area to tap in to the local Catholic audience. The film opened the week ended November 26, 1986 at Copley Place, grossing $6,000.

References

External links
 Impure Thoughts at IMDb
 Impure Thoughts at TCMDB

1986 comedy films
1986 films
American comedy films
Fiction about purgatory
1980s English-language films
1980s American films